Landing is a small settlement and unincorporated community located within Roxbury Township, in Morris County, New Jersey, United States. The community is located on the south shore of Lake Hopatcong near Hopatcong State Park. The area is served as United States Postal Service ZIP Code 07850.

As of the 2010 United States Census, the population for ZIP Code Tabulation Area 07850 was 6,436.

From the 1880s through the 1940s, it was a popular summer resort area, but by the 1970s it had evolved into a suburban community.

History 
Landing was established as a popular and important resort community. Each summer, it attracted thousands of people to the shores of Lake Hopatcong. After World War II, it began to decline and transform itself into a large suburban neighborhood. In 2017, measures were passed to give the neighborhood a facelift, the plans including several new, modern buildings, parks and signs. The improvements are expected to be complete in late 2022.

Notable people

People who were born in, residents of, or otherwise closely associated with Landing include:
 Dylan Castanheira (born 1995), soccer player who plays as a goalkeeper for Atlanta United
Karen Ann Quinlan (1954-1985), an important figure in the history of the right to die debate in the United States

See also

Lake Hopatcong station
Landing Masonry Bridge

References

External links

Landing, New Jersey Community Website

Roxbury Township, New Jersey
Unincorporated communities in Morris County, New Jersey
Unincorporated communities in New Jersey